Eddie Anthony Salcedo Mora (born 1 October 2001) is an Italian professional footballer who plays as a striker for  club Genoa, on loan from Inter Milan.

Early life 
Salcedo was born in Genoa, Italy to Colombian parents.

Club career
Salcedo is a product of the Genoa youth academy. On 20 August 2017, at the age of 15, he made his debut with the senior team in Serie A in a 0–0 away draw against Sassuolo, coming on as an 81st-minute substitute for Andrey Galabinov. 

On 16 July 2018, Salcedo joined Inter Milan on a season-long loan deal with an option to make the deal permanent. He played with Inter's U19 team in the Campionato Primavera 1 and the UEFA Youth League. The deal was made permanent on 19 June 2019 for €8m.

In summer 2019 he joined the newly promoted Hellas Verona on loan. On 3 November 2019, he scored his first Serie A goal, in the home match won 2–1 against Brescia.

On 25 September 2020 he re-joined Verona on another season-long loan.

On 31 August 2021 he joined Spezia on a season-long loan.

On 1 September 2022, Salcedo moved to Bari on loan with an option to buy. On 31 January 2023, Bari resolved Salcedo loan deal with Inter Milan. The same day the fellow Genoa announced his transfer on loan untilthe end of season.

International career
With the Italy U19 team he took part in the 2019 UEFA European Under-19 Championship.

He made his debut with the Italy U21 on 3 September 2020, in a friendly match won 2–1 against Slovenia.

Career statistics

Club

References

External links

Living people
2001 births
Footballers from Genoa
Association football forwards
Italian footballers
Italian people of Colombian descent
Sportspeople of Colombian descent
Genoa C.F.C. players
Inter Milan players
Hellas Verona F.C. players
Spezia Calcio players
S.S.C. Bari players
Serie A players
Serie B players
Italy under-21 international footballers
Italy youth international footballers